There are many $1,000 banknotes or bills, including:

 One of the withdrawn Canadian banknotes
 One of the withdrawn large denominations of United States currency
 One of the banknotes of the Hong Kong dollar
 One of the withdrawn Singapore banknotes
 One of the Fifth series of the New Taiwan Dollar banknote
 One of the banknotes of Zimbabwe

Other currencies that issue $1,000 banknotes or bills are:

See also
1000 (disambiguation)
Indian 1000-rupee note (₹1000), a denomination of the Indian rupee first introduced by the Reserve Bank of India in 1938